Mahapleu (also known as Kuépleu) is a town in western Ivory Coast. It is a sub-prefecture of Danané Department in Tonkpi Region, Montagnes District.

Mahapleu was a commune until March 2012, when it became one of 1126 communes nationwide that were abolished.

In 2021, the population of the sub-prefecture of Mahapleu was 66,898.

Villages
The twenty one villages of the sub-prefecture of Mahapleu and their population in 2014 are:

Notes

Sub-prefectures of Tonkpi
Former communes of Ivory Coast